David Lyon Bartlett (February 16, 1941 – October 12, 2017) was the J. Edward and Ruth Cox Lantz Professor Emeritus of Christian Communication at Yale Divinity School, Distinguished Professor Emeritus of New Testament at Columbia Theological Seminary, and an ordained minister of the American Baptist Churches, USA.

Education 
Bartlett completed his undergraduate education at Swarthmore College in 1962, where he earned a Bachelor of Arts. He then proceeded to attend Yale Divinity School where he earned a Bachelor of Divinity in 1967 and his Doctor of Philosophy from the Department of Religious Studies in New Testament in 1972.

Professional career 
Bartlett had a long career, holding both academic and pastoral positions. As an ordained minister of the American Baptist Churches, USA he served as the Senior Minister for congregations in Minnesota, Illinois, and California. He was also on the faculty at schools such as American Baptist Seminary of the West and Graduate Theological Union, The Divinity School of The University of Chicago, Union Theological Seminary in Richmond, Virginia, Yale Divinity School, and Columbia Theological Seminary. He was Associate Dean of Academic Affairs at Yale Divinity School for eleven years. At both Yale Divinity School and Columbia Theological Seminary he was a distinguished faculty member and was honored as professor emeritus. He also served as theologian in residence at Trinity Presbyterian Church in Atlanta.

He served for several years on the Editorial Board of works such as Interpretation and Preaching Great Texts. He has also been on the Board of Consultants for the Journal of Religion and the National Advisory Board for the Christian Networks Journal.

He worked on the Feasting on the Word commentary series. He and Barbara Brown Taylor were co-editors for this twelve volume series that aimed at giving pastors and educators a variety of views on scripture that could be easily utilized.

Writings 
Bartlett wrote a number of books and scholarly articles. He also contributed to a number of other works as editor.

Books

Edited by
 
  (twelve volumes in following years).

Chapters

References

External links
 Feasting on the Word Project
 The Congregational Church of New Canaan
 Chalice Press Author's Page
 Columbia Theological Seminary
 Yale Divinity School

1941 births
2017 deaths
20th-century Christian biblical scholars
21st-century Christian biblical scholars
American theologians
American biblical scholars
Baptist biblical scholars
Columbia Theological Seminary faculty
Yale Divinity School alumni
Swarthmore College alumni
New Testament scholars
20th-century American non-fiction writers
21st-century American non-fiction writers
20th-century American male writers
21st-century American male writers
American male non-fiction writers
20th-century Baptists